General elections were held in Jordan on 24 and 25 November 1962. As political parties were banned at the time, all candidates ran as independents.

References

Elections in Jordan
General election,1962
Jordan
Jordan
Election and referendum articles with incomplete results
Jordan